Przybylko or Przybyłko is a gender-neutral Polish surname. Notable people with the surname include:

 Kacper Przybyłko (born 1993), Polish footballer
 Mateusz Przybylko (born 1992), German high jumper

Polish-language surnames